Magassan (also Romanized as Magassan and Magassan; also known as Magassan) is a village in Oshtorinan District, Borujerd County, Lorestan Province, Iran. At the 2006 census, its population was 20, in 5 families.

References 

Populated places in Nahavand County